The Caleuche (from the Mapudungun kalewtun, "to transform, to change" and che, "people": "transformed people"), also called The Enchanted Ship, Barcoiche, The Ghost Ship, or The Warlocks' Ship, is a legendary ghost ship from Chilote mythology in southern Chile.

Origin of the legend and versions 
The legend of Caleuche is related to many aspects of history and the beliefs of the archipelago of Chiloé.

In the book of Chiloé mythology (written by Renato Cárdenas), is a collection of stories, legends and magical beliefs obtained by oral tradition:

The Caleuche is the Marino, the Ship of Magic, the Ship of fire, the Barcoiche. They are all names given to the Caluche, a marvelous ship of music and lights that travels along Chiloé canals. Certain conditions, such as foggy days, make it possible to sense and see the ship. Sounds of chains, parties, music, and a masterful figure of the ship makes it unmistakable. For some it is a mesmerizing sight and can pass right through other vessels, while others claim to have attended parties inside the ship, although they would have preferred it be on land in the company of women. For those parties they make a deal with merchants who have daughters, and The Caleuche provides them with merchandise in exchange, and thus the locals explain the rapid appearance of merchants who are never seen buying anything, but prosper quickly. Those protected by The Caleuche generally have black hens and tarred boats with ropes of quilineja.

The Caleuche can both disappear and take on the appearance of whatever it desires as to not be seen, and its sailors can transform into wolves or dolphins. Another one of the ship’s features is its extraordinary speed.  In order to witness these phenomena and not be seen, one must cover their mouth, because the first thing they sense is breath. There are also varieties of trees which one can hide behind as to not be captured by the Caleuche, some being the Chilean wineberry and the olivillo. People fear being captured by the Magical Ship, so one can never be too cautious. 

Many believe that the sailors of this ship have a leg attached to their spine, similar to the Imbunche, while others describe them as well-presented, wearing special clothing and having cold hands upon greeting them. In general, they are honest in their behavior, and with the help of their crewmates they rescue shipwreck survivors. Some believe that their final destination is the port names City of the Ceasars, a marvelous place hidden away somewhere along the Andes where its residents eternally reside. Chiloé sailors recommend that one is very respectful when trying to navigate through the area; they suggest that one not sing nor whistle, as it angers the Caleuche and gives way to the misfortune it may bring. 

Between the various hypothesis that have been proposed on the origin of the legend, it is suggested that it could be a readaptation of the European legend of the ghost ship known as The Flying Dutchman. It has also been argued that it was based on real events, such as the disappearance of the Dutch ship "The Calanche" or the mysterious disappearances of the Spanish Estrecho de Magallanes. Another possibility is that the legend has origins based on the arrival of ships to the archipelago of the Netherlands, led by Baltazar de Cordes, in an expedition that captured the island for a brief period in the year 1600. Another interpretation supports that it was originally only an invention to hide contraband operations in the Chiloé Archipelago.

There are some who credit its origin to the phenomenon of the osnis (unidentified submersible objects).

Overall, there are various versions that complement and/or differ from each other in detail. Nevertheless, what they all share in common is that it is a ship that can appear and disappear in the middle of the night, and that is it dangerous to find oneself among the mythical ship. The most widely-accepted theory is that the ship recovers the dead and revive them to live eternally on the ship, surrounded by parties and celebrations.

Magical Ship of the Drowned 
A popular version of this tale states that the ship recovers bodies of the dead from the water and gives them a new life as crewmembers who will pass eternity partying and celebrating. The Magical Ship was created by el Millalobo for la Pincoya and her brothers for this purpose.

Cursed Ship of Sailors and Enslaved Fishermen 
Another version of this tale says that the Mystical Ship would also appear in the seas of Chiloé to fascinate the fishermen with beautiful music, and upon doing so they would be converted to enslaved crewmembers who are cursed forever with a leg attached to their back as an Ivunche, forced to work on the ship for all of eternity.

Magical Transport Ship of Sorcerers of Chiloé 
As common as the tale of a haunted ship of dead and enslaved sailors, there also exists a version of this tale where the Magical Ship houses sorcerers of Chiloé, and they party and transport merchandise. It is also stated that the sorcerers return from a voyage that they make every 3 months in order to strengthen their powers. It is said that only crewmembers can board the ship and use the Caballo marino Chilote as a form of transportation. Per Millalobo’s orders, it is prohibited that others board or enter the ship by any means. 

Another version is that the crew of the Caleuche makes magical pacts with certain traders ensuring them prosperity in exchange for favors such as using their houses for parties or other illegal or dark purposes. Because of this version of the legend when a person in Chiloé gets rich quickly, it is often attributed to his having made a pact with the crew of the Caleuche. Rumors like these were rampant following the 1960 Valdivia earthquake because some houses were untouched by the fires that swept through Chiloé afterwards. In that same decade there were stories that the sounds of a ship dropping anchor could be heard around the houses of many prosperous merchants in the Chiloé archipelago. These were supposedly the sounds of the Caleuche stealthily delivering goods and treasures to those with whom it had a pact. However, most people rejected this supernatural explanation and instead blamed the merchant's prosperity on mortal, rather than supernatural, smugglers.

In media
The legend of the Caleuche is referred to in Alastair Reynolds' 2001 novel Chasm City, when the Chilean crewmembers of a generation ship discover a "ghost ship" trailing the flotilla of colony vessels and dub the ship Caleuche.

The Caleuche is a living vessel which travels the world, carrying a crew of monster hunters in The Luke Coles Book Series by Josh Walker.

In film and television, Raúl Ruiz's Three Crowns of the Sailor (1983) and Litoral (2008) and Jorge Olguín's Caleuche: The Call of the Sea (2012) are all loosely inspired by the legend.

Scientific namesakes
Caleuche Chasma, the deepest canyon on the moon Charon, is named after the Caleuche. The exoplanet HD 164604 b is also formally named Caleuche.

See also
Mapuche mythology
Chilean mythology
Chiloé

References

 Cárdenas, Antonio. El Triángulo del Pacífico. Imprenta ARCA. 1996. 74 p. (Spanish)
 Mancilla Pérez, Juan. Magia y brujería en Chiloé. Secretos de Mitología. Medicina Popular. 2006. 74 p. (Spanish)
 Michel Meurger, Claude Gagnon. Lake monster traditions: a cross-cultural analysis. Fortean Tomes, 1988.
Conte, Jeanne (1999). "Tapestry of Horrors". World & I. Volume 14:192-200-Via MasterFILE Complete
Torres, Sergio Mansilla (2009). "Mutaciones culturales de Chiloé: los mitos y las leyendas en la modernidad neoliberal isleña" Convergencia: Revista de Ciencias Sociales, volume 17, issue 51, starting on page 271-VIa Fuente Académica Premier.
Pérez, Floridor (2007). Mitos y leyendas de Chile. Santiago de Chile: Zig-Zag.
Chilote mythology
Mythological ships
Afterlife places
Legendary ghost ships